WCUA may refer to:

 WCUA (Catholic University of America), an unlicensed college radio station
 WCUA-LP, a defunct low-power radio station (101.9 FM) formerly licensed to serve Peoria, Illinois, United States